Deepak Jaitoi, also spelled as Deepak Jatoi, was a British-Indian Punjabi-language Ghazal-writer as well as songwriter. He worked for Punjabi for about six decades of his life.

Early life

Jaitoi was born as Gurcharan Singh on 26 April 1919, to father S. Inder Singh and mother Veer Kaur, in the village of Jaitu in the Punjab Province of British India (now in Faridkot district). His father was also a poet. He started writing poetry in early age then became a disciple of Harbans Lal Mujrim Dasuhi and learn Ghazal writing from him.

Work

When he entered the world of writing, Ghazal writing in Punjabi was considered impossible. He accepted Punjabi Ghazal writing as a challenge and published many books. He also wrote songs in Punjabi. His songs, aah lai maae saambh kunjian, dhian kar challian sardari and jutti laggdi haania mere, ve putt na pulanghan lammian, recorded by singer Narinder Biba got very popular.

Selected publications 

 G̲h̲azala dī adā: g̲h̲azalāṃ
 Dīpaka dī loa: g̲h̲azala saṅgrahi
 Coṇawīāṃ ghazalāṃ

References

1919 births
2005 deaths
Punjabi people
Indian Sikhs
Indian emigrants to England
Indian emigrants to the United Kingdom
British people of Indian descent
British people of Punjabi descent
British Sikhs
English people of Indian descent
English people of Punjabi descent
English Sikhs
Punjabi-language lyricists
Punjabi-language writers
Punjabi-language songwriters